Cycloundecane is a saturated cyclic organic compound with eleven carbon atoms forming a ring. It is classed as an alkane because it has only carbon and hydrogen and these elements are configured with C–H and C–C such that there is a chain of carbon atoms with hydrogens attached to them. For each of the carbon atoms in the chain there is a pair of hydrogen atoms such that the chemical formula is C11H22. The compound is stable, but it burns with sufficient ignition heat.

Variants of this compound, for example, bicycloundecane, have been proposed for use in conductors for electronic circuitry.

References

Cycloalkanes